Teshkan may refer to:
 Teshkan, Afghanistan
 Teşkan, Azerbaijan
 Teshkan Rural District, Iran